The Vakil was an Urdu language newspaper published from Amritsar during the British Raj. Initially it was bi-weekly newspaper but later it became three days. This newspaper was started by Inayatullah Khan Mashriqi's father Khan Ata Muhammad Khan in 1895 and published until about July 28, 1931.

The first editor of the newspaper was Mirza Hairat Dehlavi but separated after editing two pamphlets. In October of the same year, Insha Allah Khan became the editor. Abul Kalam Azad was associated with Vakil as one of the editor for five years, from 1903 to 1908.

References

Further reading 
 

1895 establishments in India
Defunct newspapers published in India
Urdu-language newspapers published in India
1931 disestablishments in India